Contagious may refer to:

 Contagious disease

Literature
 Contagious (magazine), a marketing publication
 Contagious (novel), a science fiction thriller novel by Scott Sigler

Music

Albums
Contagious (Peggy Scott-Adams album), 1997
Contagious (Sitti album), 2009
Contagious (Third Day album), 1994
Contagious (Y&T album), 1987
Contagious, a 1987 album by The Bar-Kays
Contagious, a 2009 album by  Tarrus Riley
Contagious, a 2012 album by Terron Brooks
Contagious, a 2003 EP by Arena

Songs
"Contagious" (song), a 2001 song by The Isley Brothers
"Contagious" by Anarbor, from the album The Words You Don't Swallow
"Contagious" by Avril Lavigne, from the album The Best Damn Thing
"Contagious" by Boys Like Girls, from the album Love Drunk
"Contagious" by Collective Soul, from the album See What You Started by Continuing
"Contagious" by Ludacris featuring Jamie Foxx, from the album Theater of the Mind
"Contagious" by Saving Abel, from the album Miss America
"Contagious" by Trapt, from the album Only Through the Pain
"Contagious" by Young Thug, from the album Punk
"Contagious" by Frankie Laine
"Contagious" by Learning Music
"Contagious" by Marc Robillard
"Contagious" by The Whispers
"Us" (Regina Spektor song) by Regina Spektor

Other uses
 Contagious (film), a 1997 U.S. film

See also

 Contagious Diseases Acts (UK)
 Contagious Diseases (Animals) Act (UK)
 
 
 Contagion (disambiguation)